The women's singles wheelchair tennis competition at the 2012 Summer Paralympics in London was held from 3 September to 8 September.

Calendar

Seeds

Draw

Key

INV = Bipartite invitation
ITF = ITF place
ALT = Alternate

r = Retired
w/o = Walkover

Finals

Top half

Bottom half

References 
 
 

Women's doubles
2012 in women's tennis